Cayetana is a Spanish feminine given name. It may refer to:

Cayetana (band)
Cayetana blanca, Spanish grape variety

People
 Cayetana Álvarez de Toledo (b. 1974), Spanish journalist and politician
 Cayetana Fitz-James Stuart, 18th Duchess of Alba (1926–2014), Spanish aristocrat
 Cayetana Guillén Cuervo (b. 1969), Spanish actress
 Cayetana Elizabeth Hutcheson (b. 1974), English author and television presenter
 María Cayetana de Silva, 13th Duchess of Alba (1762–1802), Spanish aristocrat

See also
Cayetano